Bianca Anghel (born July 25, 1985) is a Romanian long track speed skater who participates in international competitions.

Personal records

Career highlights

World Single Distance Championships
2004 - Seoul, 19th at 1500 m
2004 - Seoul, 17th at 3000 m
European Allround Championships
2003 - Heerenveen, 16th
2004 - Heerenveen, 14th
2005 - Heerenveen, 20th
2008 - Kolomna,  25th
World Junior Allround Championships
2001 - Groningen, 34th
2002 - Collalbo, 24th
2003 - Kushiro, 10th
2004 - Roseville, 5th
2005 - Seinäjoki, 13th
National Championships
2002 - Miercurea Ciuc,  2nd at allround
2003 - Miercurea Ciuc,  1st at 1000 m
2003 - Miercurea Ciuc,  1st at 500 m
2003 - Miercurea Ciuc,  1st at 1500 m
2003 - Miercurea Ciuc,  1st at 3000 m
2003 - Miercurea Ciuc,  1st at allround
2004 - Miercurea Ciuc,  1st at 1000 m
2004 - Miercurea Ciuc,  1st at 500 m
2004 - Miercurea Ciuc,  2nd at 3000 m
2004 - Miercurea Ciuc,  3rd at allround
Nordic Junior Games
2004 - Berlin,  2nd at 1000 m

External links
Anghel at Jakub Majerski's Speedskating Database
Anghel at SkateResults.com

1985 births
Living people
Romanian female speed skaters
Place of birth missing (living people)